Hannes Koch (12 February 1935 – 26 December 1994) was a German racewalker. He competed in the men's 20 kilometres walk at the 1960 Summer Olympics.

References

1935 births
1994 deaths
Athletes (track and field) at the 1960 Summer Olympics
German male racewalkers
Olympic athletes of the United Team of Germany
Place of birth missing